Shokichi Yagi (八木 将吉 Yagi Shōkichi; born October 3, 1985, in Tomakomai, Hokkaido), better known by his stage name SHOKICHI, is a Japanese singer, dancer, songwriter, composer and actor. He is a vocalist and performer of Exile and Exile The Second. He was also a member of J Soul Brothers' second generation Nidaime J Soul Brothers until their migration to Exile in 2009.

Shokichi debuted as a soloist with the single "BACK TO THE FUTURE" on June 14, 2014. For his solo activities he uses the stage name EXILE SHOKICHI.

Biography 
Shokichi Yagi was born on October 3, 1985, in Tomakomai, Hokkaido (Japan). He has a younger brother, Masayasu Yagi, who is an actor, singer and member of Gekidan Exile.

In July 2006 Shokichi participated in the EXILE VOCAL BATTLE AUDITION 2006 ~ASIAN DREAM~, but failed. After that, he also failed the COLOR audition, which led him to the decision to attend the EXPG (Exile Professional Gym), LDH's talent academy. This finally made it possible for him to join Nidaime J Soul Brothers in 2007. The group announced their indefinite hiatus after releasing one album in 2009 and all members joined the line-up of Exile shortly after.

In 2012, Shokichi joined the Exile sub-unit Exile The Second alongside his fellow former Nidaime J Soul Brothers members Nesmith, Kenchi, Keiji and Tetsuya.

In 2013, he played his first leading role in the Nippon TV drama Frenemy: Dobunezumi no Machi alongside Exile/Sandaime J Soul Brothers member Naoto.

On June 14, 2014, he debuted as a soloist with the single "BACK TO THE FUTURE". On October 22, Shokichi released his 2nd single "The One". At the end of the year he was invited to perform at the Asia Song Festival 2014 in South Korea together with DJ Hal.

On July 22, 2015, he released his 3rd single "Don't Stop the Music". The B-side tracks featured several of his label mates, such as CrazyBoy on "Anytime" and PKCZ on "Y.L.S.S.". Shortly after on August 16, Shokichi performed for the first time at Summer Sonic 2015 in Osaka. Additionally, the title track of his 4th single "IGNITION" was used as the theme song for the Japanese release of the American movie The Transporter Refueled which was released on October 24.

On April 27, 2016, Shokichi released his first solo album, titled THE FUTURE.On May 14, 2018 it was announced that Exile The Second's song "Hi Noboru Hikari ni ~ Pray for Now ~ " (日昇る光に ～Pray for Now～; Sunlight rising to Pray for Now), written by Shokichi, was chosen as the official support song for the Japanese Judo Federation during the 2020 Tokyo Olympics. On July 16, he performed at DANCE EARTH FESTIVAL 2018 ～SPLASH SUMMER～, a festival hosted by LDH. In the same month, he established and started producing his own label KOMA DOGG. This project is hosted by him at LDH Music & Publishing, LDH's own record label. Shortly after he participated in another festival, DOBERMAN INFINITY presents D.Island 2018.

On October 3, 2018, his 33rd birthday, Shokichi released his 6th single "Futen Boyz". The music video for the title track features him and his brother Masayasu Yagi, who is also appearing in the movie DTC - Yukemuri Junjō-hen - from HiGH& LOW (DTC -湯けむり純情篇- from HiGH＆LOW) for which this track is used as the theme song. On December 15, 2018, he released his first photo book titled BYAKUYA. The first press edition included a new song with the same title, "Byakuya" (白夜; White Night).

On February 12, 2019 it was announced that Shokichi would release his second album and hold the first solo arena tour in his career. The release of his second album 1114, thoroughly composed and written by himself, was set for May 15 with the title representing the number of days since the release of his first album THE FUTURE. His tour EXILE SHOKICHI LIVE TOUR 2019"UNDERDOGG" went from June 29 to September 15 with 8 performances in 6 cities. Shokichi also composed the debut track of Ballistik Boyz from Exile Tribe, "Tenhane -1000%-" (テンハネ -1000%-) in the same year.

Business

Koma Dogg 
KOMA DOGG is Shokichi's own label which he established in July 2018. He started this project because he wants to contribute to LDH with music by becoming a representative producer of the company. Furthermore, he enjoys collaborating with various artists and likes to challenge himself. The goal of his label is to let musicians be able to express themselves freely, pursue creativity and create an enjoyable production environment. Since its establishment, the label has signed Japanese artists such as Salu and Kodai Sato. Shokichi stated his next step is to increase the number of artists even more.

Participating groups

Discography

Singles

Digital Singles

Albums

Covers

Collaboration single

Participating works

Compositions and lyrics

Tie-up

Filmography

TV programmes

TV dramas

Advertisements

Music videos

Live

Photobook

References

Notes

External links
 at Exile Official Website 
 

Japanese male pop singers
Japanese male singer-songwriters
Japanese singer-songwriters
Japanese lyricists
Japanese male composers
Musicians from Hokkaido
1985 births
Living people
LDH (company) artists
People from Tomakomai, Hokkaido
21st-century Japanese singers
21st-century Japanese male singers